Odile Duboc (23 July 1941 in Versailles – 23 April 2010 in Paris) was a French dancer, choreographer and teacher of contemporary dance.

She died on 23 April 2010 at the age of 69, as a result of cancer.

Works 
 Les Mots de la matière, DVD book, "Les Solitaires Intempestifs" publishing house, Besançon, 2012, .

References 

Sources
 
 

20th-century French dancers
French choreographers
Contemporary dance
People from Versailles
1941 births
2010 deaths
Deaths from cancer in France
French female dancers
French women choreographers
20th-century French women